Operation: Matriarchy, known in Russia as Velian (Велиан), is a 2005 science fiction first-person shooter game developed by Russian studio MADia Entertainment and published by Buka Entertainment for Microsoft Windows. The game is a spin-off from MADia's simulation franchise Echelon.

Gameplay

Plot
In the 24th century mankind has formed itself into the Federation of Earth, and has colonized several other planets. However, around 2350 a mysterious virus ravages the colony planet of Velia, targeting only the females within the population. They are transformed into brutal killing-machines, while the males are enslaved for use as sustenance or as subjects for genetic experiments. Having now evolved into an aggressive hive mind, the Velians turn on the Federation, instigating a brutal war. The game begins seven years into the conflict, when the player character, Senior Sergeant Paul Armstrong of the Federation, finds himself forced to take on the Velians when they attack his ship.

Reception

Community support
Operation: Matriarchy was released with what appeared to be damaged music files and incomplete sound files; all of the music files, except for the main menu track, simply play static, while several of the sound files are simply silence. A pair of fan-made mods that replace these files and made other enhancements to the game were released. In 2007, a fan-made music and sound enhancement unofficial patch was released, which added a complete in-game music score and enhanced sound effects. In addition, the story was rewritten. In 2009, a fan-made adaption appeared. This offered a complete (optional) translation to German and further changes to the sound effects and music. However, the largest changes were to the visuals, with enhanced lighting and improved versions of many textures and bump maps.

References

External links
 Official website 
 Operation: Matriarchy at MobyGames

2005 video games
First-person shooters
Multiplayer and single-player video games
Science fiction video games
Video game spin-offs
Video games developed in Russia
Video games set in the 24th century
Windows games
Windows-only games
Buka Entertainment games